Ittiam Systems is a venture capital funded technology company founded by ex-Managing Director of Texas Instruments' India Srini Rajam in 2001. It is headquartered in Bangalore, India and has marketing offices in the United States,  UK, France, Japan, Mainland China, Singapore and Taiwan.

Ittiam Systems is India's first technology firm to be based on licensing of intellectual property (IP).  Revenue is mainly generated through licensing of its DSP intellectual property and reference designs.

One of its early United States customers was e.Digital Corporation, a San Diego-based company that developed the digEplayer portable audio/video in-flight entertainment device under contract by Tacoma, Washington-based APS, now named digEcor.  
 
Ittiam Systems demonstrated its HEVC and VP9 implementations accelerated using ARM Mali-T600 GPU Compute technology at CES 2014 and MWC 2014.

References 

Electronics companies established in 2001
Digital signal processors
Electronics companies of India
Ittiam
2001 establishments in Karnataka